Arissa Khan is an Indian model, entrepreneur and beauty queen.

Early life
Khan was born in Mumbai, India to a Muslim family and was the first Femina Miss Campus Princess 2014 India.

References

External links
In pics: Campus Princess 2014 winner, Indiatimes, 1 March 2014

Living people
1994 births